The 2023 U Sports Women's Ice Hockey Championship was held March 16–19, 2023, in Montreal, Quebec, to determine a national champion for the 2022–23 U Sports women's ice hockey season. The eighth-seeded Mount Royal Cougars defeated the defending champion Concordia Stingers by a score of 4–3 in overtime to win the program's first national title.

Host
The tournament was played at CEPSUM on the campus of at the Université de Montréal. This was the first time that the Université de Montréal had hosted the tournament. The Montreal Carabins were originally supposed to host the 2021 championship, but that tournament was cancelled due to the COVID-19 pandemic in Canada.

Participating teams

Championship bracket

Consolation bracket

References

External links
 Tournament Web Site

U Sports women's ice hockey
Ice hockey competitions in Montreal
2022–23 in Canadian ice hockey
2023 in Quebec